Naduiyeh-ye Miani (also Romanized as Nadū’īyeh-ye Mīānī; also known as Nadūeeyeh) is a village in Rezvan Rural District, Jebalbarez District, Jiroft County, Kerman Province, Iran. At the 2006 census, its population was 43, in 6 families.

References 

Populated places in Jiroft County